Manna is a town and the capital of South Bengkulu Regency in Bengkulu province, Indonesia. Its population is 26,880.

Climate
Manna has a tropical rainforest climate (Af) with heavy to very heavy rainfall year-round

References

Regency seats of Bengkulu